The North Mole Lighthouse began operation in 1906 at entrance to Fremantle Harbour. The lighthouse established permanent service from 1906; after the mole's foundations had settled a temporary lighting arrangement there was discharged. The light originally planned for the house was found to be too powerful and was sent to Broome for the steel lighthouse at Gantheume Point.

The lighthouse and its technically identical yet green coloured partner on the south mole are the last remaining of their type. It has an 'indicative place' status of the Register of the National Estate and is a well-known landmark to seamen visiting the port.
It was designed by Charles Yelverton O'Connor, an engineer responsible for the construction  of Fremantle Harbour and who advanced the proposal of the Goldfields Water Supply Scheme. The 15 m tower is made of cast iron, painted red and features classical decorations.  It is located at the end of North Mole Drive.  The position is a well used recreational fishing spot and a vantage point for ocean yacht racing or birdwatching.

See also 

Lighthouses and lightvessels in Australia
Woodman Light

References

External links

Lighthouses completed in 1906
Heritage places in Fremantle
Lighthouses in Western Australia
Fremantle Harbour
1906 establishments in Australia